Christian Erickson is an American actor based in Paris, France. He is known for his role as La Trémoille in The Messenger: The Story of Joan of Arc (1999), as General Kormarov in the film adaption of Hitman and as Lance Boyle, the TV presenter in the MegaRace video games series.

Partial filmography

Films

 The Sidelong Glances of a Pigeon Kicker (1970) - Gordon (uncredited)
 Fun with Dick and Jane (1977) - Trans-Sexual
 My Friend Washington (1984)
 Le 4ème pouvoir (1985)
 Asterix Versus Caesar (1985) - (English version, voice)
 À notre regrettable époux (1988)
 Dangerous Liaisons (1988) - Bailiff
 Aventure de Catherine C. (1990) - L'Anglais
 Near Mrs. (1992) - Col. Edward Young
 The Man in the Iron Mask (1998) - Ballroom Guard
 The Messenger: The Story of Joan of Arc (1999) - La Trémoille
 Kennedy et moi (1999) - Le vendeur canadien
 Le divorce (2003) - Museum Curator
 The Statement (2003) - Father Joseph
 Les ombres (2003, Short) - Meyris
 Touristes? Oh yes! (2004)
 Twice Upon a Time (2006) - Richard
 Arthur and the Invisibles (2006) - Antique Dealer
 Hitman (2007) - General Kormarov
 Ca$h (2008) - Kruger
 8th Wonderland (2008) - NASSI President
 Eight Times Up (2009) - Monroe
 La rafle (2010) - MacLelland
 Les Aventures extraordinaires d'Adèle Blanc-Sec (2010) - La momie 'Ramses II'
 Black Venus (2010) - Lord Ellenborough
 Au Revoir My Paris Heart (2010) - Gerard
 Always Brando (2011) - James
 Le Skylab (2011) - Toby (dans le train)
 Dernier amour (2019) - Lord Pembroke
 Blood Machines (2019) - Lago

Television

 Mistral's Daughter (1984) - Ed
 Madame et ses flics (1985) - Woodward
 Crossbow (1987) - Lascal
 Renseignements généraux (1991) - James, le butler
 Counterstrike (1992) - Traherne
 Orson and Olivia (1993) (voice)
 Fall from Grace (1994)
 Insektors (1994) - (voice, USA dub)
 Dog Tracer (1996) - (voice)
 Highlander (1998) - Jack Kendall
 Lost Souls (1998, TV Movie) - Jack Mennias
 Funny Little Bugs (2001) - (voice)
 Martin Morning (2003) - (voice)
 Commander Clark (2010) - (voice)
 The Mysterious Cities of Gold (2012) - (voice)

Video games

 MegaRace (1993) - Lance Boyle
 Relentless: Twinsen's Adventure (1994) - Dino-Fly / Dr. Funfrock / Grobos / Groboclones (voice)
 The Last Dynasty (1995) - (voice)
 MegaRace 2 (1996) - Lance Boyle
 Atlantis: The Lost Tales (1997) - (voice)
 Dark Earth (1997) - (voice)
 AmerZone: The Explorer's Legacy (1999) - Antonio Àlvarez (English version, voice)
 Outcast (1999) - William Kauffman (voice)
 Omikron: The Nomad Soul (1999) - (voice)
 The Devil Inside (2000) - Jack T. Ripper (English version, voice)
 Frank Herbert's Dune (2001)
 Alone in the Dark: The New Nightmare (2001) - (voice)
 MegaRace 3 (2002) - Lance Boyle
 Platoon (2002) - Stephen Evers (voice)
 XIII (2003) - Galbrain / Dr. Johnansson / Conspiracy Members #2 (voice)
 Syberia II (2004) - Colonel Emeliov Goupatchev (English version, voice)
 Fahrenheit (2005) - The Oracle / John (English version, voice)
 Paradise (2006) - (English version, voic, as Christian Eriksson)
 Dark Messiah of Might and Magic (2006) - Menelag (English version, voice)
 Heavy Rain (2010) - The Doc / Motel Receptionist / Blue Lagoon Barman (voice)
 MegaRace: DeathMatch (In Development)
 Shadow Stalkers (In Development)

Web series
 Raising Hitler (2017)

Multimedia Show 

 Songs of the Sea (2007) - Oscar The Tiger Fish, Seahorse
 Wings Of Time (2014) - Shahbaz

Music
 The Dark waltz (2015, Disk and dvd, english translation and interpretation in Les Funambules )
http://www.les-funambules.com/chansons/les-funambules/

MegaRace Reboot

On April 15, 2014 it was announced conversions of the entire MegaRace Trilogy were being made for mobile and tablet devices along with a reboot of the franchise on PCs, game consoles, mobile, and tablet devices by ZOOM Platform and Jordan Freeman Group. It was revealed in the same press release that Mr. Erickson had already been signed on board for the MegaRace Reboot project to reprise his role as MegaRace host, "Lance Boyle".

On June 18, 2014 a teaser video featuring Christian Erickson as "Lance Boyle" appeared on YouTube. Christian Erickson has also appeared in all previous MegaRace titles as "Lance Boyle".

References

External links
 
 
 
 

American male voice actors
Living people
American male video game actors
American expatriate male actors in France
Year of birth missing (living people)